Octoglena is a genus of millipedes in the family Hirudisomatidae. There are about seven described species in Octoglena.

Species
These seven species belong to the genus Octoglena:
 Octoglena anura (Cook, 1904)
 Octoglena bivirgata Wood, 1864
 Octoglena bivirgatum Wood, 1864
 Octoglena claraqua
 Octoglena gracilipes (Loomis, 1971)
 Octoglena prolata Shelley, 1996
 Octoglena sierra Shelley, 1996

References

External links

 

Polyzoniida
Millipedes of North America
Articles created by Qbugbot